Tamara Murphy is an American chef who owns and runs the restaurant Terra Plata in Seattle. In 1995, she won the James Beard Foundation Award for Best Chef in the Pacific Northwest and Hawaii.

Career
After working in several New York City based restaurants, Tamara Murphy moved to Seattle. She worked at the restaurant Dominique's, where she was a sous chef. While working there, she competed in the Bocuse d'Or competition. After two years, she joined the restaurant Campagne as executive chef, where she was nominated for the James Beard Foundation Award for Rising Star Chef.

In 1993, the oversaw the opening of Café Campagne, while continuing to work at Campagne. She won the 1995 James Beard Foundation Award for Best Chef in the Pacific Northwest and Hawaii while running those restaurants. She decided to open her own restaurant, and with the backing of the owners of Campagne, opened Brasa in 1999. Brasa was initially such a success that the 170-seat restaurant was regularly full, but closed after a few years due to the economic downturn.

She began running the Elliott Bay Café in 2008, where she served an organic and sustainable menu. Following a legal battle with the developers, she opened her restaurant Terra Plata in 2012.

References

Living people
American women chefs
American chefs
James Beard Foundation Award winners
People from Seattle
Year of birth missing (living people)
21st-century American women